Carl Lauritz Mechelborg Oppen (1830–1914) was a Norwegian jurist and politician.

A jurist by education, he worked as a civil servant in various government ministries. In 1875, he became County Governor of Nordre Bergenhus amt, a post he held until 1889 when he became County Governor of Stavanger amt. He held this position until 1910.

References

1830 births
1914 deaths
Norwegian civil servants
County governors of Norway